Herman T. Costello (October 27, 1920 – June 11, 2017) was an American politician. Costello served as Mayor of Burlington, New Jersey. Costello also served in the New Jersey General Assembly from the 7th Legislative District from 1976 to 1982 and in the New Jersey Senate from 1982 to 1984.

References

1920 births
2017 deaths
Mayors of Burlington, New Jersey
Democratic Party New Jersey state senators
Democratic Party members of the New Jersey General Assembly